The Journal of the American Philosophical Association, is a peer-reviewed academic journal published quarterly by the American Philosophical Association in partnership with Cambridge University Press. Launched in March 2015, the journal contains scholarly articles in philosophy and the exchange of ideas between philosophy and other fields, representing the diversity of philosophy as a discipline.

The Journal of the American Philosophical Association is a member of the Committee on Publication Ethics.

References

External links
Journal of the American Philosophical Association
American Philosophical Association

Philosophy journals
Quarterly journals
English-language_journals
Academic journals published by learned and professional societies
Publications established in 2015